The 2008 Sun Belt Conference men's basketball tournament took place March 5–11, 2008. The first round was held at campus sites. The quarterfinals, semifinals and championship game took place in Mobile, Alabama at the Mitchell Center. The semifinals were televised by ESPN Regional Television. The Sun Belt Conference Championship Game were televised by ESPN2.

Bracket

Asterisk denotes game ended in overtime.

External links
2008 Men's Tournament

References

Sun Belt Conference men's basketball tournament
Tournament
Sun Belt Conference men's basketball tournament
Sun Belt Conference men's basketball tournament